Duga Luka refers to the following places:

 Duga Luka, Croatia
 Duga Luka, Serbia